Operation Uphold Democracy was a military intervention designed to remove the military regime installed by the 1991 Haitian coup d'état that overthrew the elected President Jean-Bertrand Aristide. The operation was effectively authorized by the 31 July 1994 United Nations Security Council Resolution 940.

History

The operation began with the alert of United States and its allies for a forced entry into the island nation of Haiti. U.S. Navy, Coast Guard, and Air Force elements staged to Puerto Rico and southern Florida to prepare to support the airborne invasion, spearheaded by elements of the Joint Special Operations Command (HQ, 75th Ranger Regiment), followed by 3rd Special Forces Group, the U.S. Army 7th Transportation Group (Army watercraft and terminal elements) and the 10th Mountain Division. Some of these elements were staged out of Hunter Army Airfield and Guantanamo Bay Naval Base. The operation was directed by Lieutenant General Hugh Shelton, Joint Task Force 120 (JTF-120), provided by Commander, Carrier Group Two.

Diplomatic efforts
On 16 September 1994, as these forces prepared to invade, with the lead elements of the 82nd Airborne Division already in the air, a diplomatic element led by former President Jimmy Carter, U.S. Senator Sam Nunn and retired Chairman of the Joint Chiefs of Staff General Colin Powell persuaded the leaders of Haiti to step down and allow the elected officials to return to power. The main leader holding power was General Joseph Raoul Cédras and was the key focus of the delegation. General Powell's personal relationship with Cédras, from when Cédras was a student in the School of the Americas as a young officer, played a significant role in the American delegation gaining an audience with the dictator and enabling the conduct of negotiations for approximately two weeks.

Despite the insistent diplomatic efforts of the American delegation and the insinuation that force would be used if required, negotiations were at a virtual stalemate for the entire time with General Cédras refusing to concede to the legitimacy of the democratic elections. As a final effort to force the dictator to step down without violence, the delegation presented General Cédras with a video feed of the 82nd Airborne Division's aircraft being loaded with troops, with the Division's DRF-1 (Division Ready Force 1, the Battalion designated first to deploy, with its equipment and vehicles pre-loaded for parachute drop world-wide) 1st Battalion, 325th Airborne Infantry Regiment "Red Falcons" already deployed to Ft. Sherman, Panama. Therefore, the 2nd Battalion, 325th AIR "White Falcons" were attached to the 1st Brigade, 82nd Airborne Division Ready Brigade-1 (DRB-1). While allowing Cédras to process the panic-inducing sight, he was informed that while he assumed he was watching a live feed, he was in fact viewing a video captured more than 2 hours before. As such, the lead elements of the 3,900-strong paratrooper force had already launched from Fort Bragg, North Carolina and were currently over the Atlantic Ocean. They further informed him of the United States' commitment to supporting democracy and that a forced-entry airborne assault on the island nation would, in all likelihood, result in Haiti coming under U.S. control before the next sunrise.

Invasion, ultimatum, and capitulation

The delegation proceeded to issue a final ultimatum to the dictator. His choices were to either recognize the wish of the Haitian people as expressed through the democratic election of Jean-Bertrand Aristide and quietly retire, or continue to deny the election's outcome; in which case the U.S. would forcibly wrest control of his country and see justice done. To remove all uncertainty from the general's mind, he was reminded by the delegation that the 82nd Airborne Division had also spearheaded overwhelmingly decisive victories during Operation Urgent Fury in Grenada and Operation Just Cause in Panama in the recent past. Within minutes, General Cédras capitulated under the most favorable terms available to him at that time.

Cédras's capitulation took a while to be decided, and even after it was done, did not immediately become law among the Armed Forces of Haiti; nor was it immediately followed by other members of the junta. As a result, U.S. forces landing in Haiti saw their objective as severing the junta leadership from the FAd'H without provoking a panic among the rank and file. To facilitate this, General Shelton negotiated a turnover of command from Cédras to Major General Jean-Claude Duperval, who in turn promoted figures acceptable to Aristide into high positions in the FAd’H. Believing that he needed the FAd'H in the short run to avert anarchy, Shelton determined to reform the organization incrementally. Its abrupt collapse, he feared, would start a rapid and uncontrollable social decompression that might result in a large-scale insurgency. American rules of engagement were very restrictive; even paramilitary junta supporters in FRAPH were to be treated as a legitimate political entity and thus not subject to neutralization unless they attacked first. Inclined initially to view the Americans as liberators, most ordinary Haitians experienced a profound sense of unfulfilled expectations upon discovery that American soldiers were negotiating and then collaborating with the despised FAd’H in maintaining order in the capital. Many Haitians had expected the U.S. to exact retribution from members of the junta. President Aristide urged the populace to remain calm until his return.

In one case on 20 September, recently landed U.S. Army soldiers in Port-au-Prince stood by while a protesting crowd was violently dispersed by the Haitian police, resulting in a civilian death. The state of affairs was such that many Haitians did not know who was supposed to be in charge of the city. Following outcry among the U.S. military and citizenry, as well as among Haitians, the U.S. Army quickly changed its ROE. Behind the scenes, Shelton sent an emissary, Colonel Michael Sullivan, commander of the 16th Military Police (MP) Brigade, to Port-au-Prince Police Chief Colonel Michel Francois with an unequivocal message that assaults on the populace would stop or Francois would be held accountable.

The U.S. Marines who occupied Haiti's second largest city, Cap Haitien, had less restrictive rules; they began immediate foot patrols upon arriving, establishing a strong presence. One such patrol came across a FAd'H unit deemed to be making "threatening gestures" on 24 September, resulting in a brief firefight: ten FAd'H troops were killed for no U.S. losses. The incident helped establish U.S. authority in the public's mind (and was received enthusiastically by the populace when news spread the next day), though it was far from the last violent incident of the occupation. On 29 September, a FRAPH terrorist hurled a grenade into a crowd at a ceremony marking the reinstallation of popular Port-au-Prince mayor, Evans Paul; the terrorist was apprehended by the Marines the next day, and interrogated.

Peacekeeping
With his capitulation, the 100-plus aircraft carrying the 82nd Airborne Division were either turned around in mid-air or unloaded before they had a chance to take off. The paratroopers returned to their unit areas on Fort Bragg and they resumed their ready status; only to have the DRF-1 unit, Task Force Panther, deployed to Panama for Operations Safe Haven and Safe Passage on 12 December 1994. The military mission changed from a combat operation to a peacekeeping and nation-building operation with the deployment of the US-led multinational force in Haiti. This force was made up primarily of members of the 3rd Special Forces Group, but also included members of the 16th Military Police Brigade, 118th Military Police Company (Fort Bragg, NC), the 101st Military Police Company, the 988th Military Police Company (Fort Benning, Georgia)and 101st Aviation Brigade (Ft. Campbell, Kentucky), 3/2 ACR from Ft. Polk, Louisiana and Marine Forces Caribbean. Teams were deployed throughout the country to establish order and humanitarian services. Regular Army forces consisting of units from the 10th Mountain Division occupied Port-au-Prince with 3rd Bn (Airborne) 73rd Armor Regiment (82nd Airborne Division) and elements from the U.S. Army Materiel Command provided logistical support in the form of the Joint Logistics Support Command (JLSC) which provided oversight and direct control over all Multinational Force and U.S. deployed logistics units. This included the Joint Material Management Center, JMMC and the follow on civilian contractor LOGCAP including a senior Defense Support Agency CELL. Later, 3 Corps deployed the Corps support CMMC, 46th Support Group. Additionally in the early deployments, elements of the 44th Medical Brigade (Airborne), 55th Medical Group, from Fort Bragg {the majority from the 28th CSH (Combat Support Hospital)} provided medical care for service members and Haitians alike. A Joint Psychological Operations Task Force (JPOTF) composed primarily of elements from the United States Army's 4th Psyop Group (Airborne) and reserve augmentees provided continuous, effective information operations support throughout Uphold Democracy and successive operations.

Numerous 210' and 270' medium endurance cutters, a 180' buoy tender , as well as 110' patrol boats worked with Navy SEAL gunboats to provide security for forces entering and exiting the twelve-mile exclusion zone and Port-au-Prince Harbor.

In August 1994, the battalion departed for the Caribbean and Haitian waters for Operation Support Democracy. 2nd Battalion, 2nd Marines once again landed in Cap Haitian, Haiti on 20 September 1994. Participation in Operation Uphold Democracy lasted until October 1994. A squad from Echo Company engaged in a firefight with coup-supporting elements of the Haitian police and military. One Navy interpreter was wounded and several Haitians lost their lives. The 10th Mountain Division was relieved in place by units of the 25th Infantry Division (Light) under command of Major General George A. Fisher Jr. The 25th Infantry Division deployed on 4 January 1995 from their home station of Schofield Barracks, Hawaii and officially assumed command authority from the 10th Division on 9 January 1995. General Fisher and the 25th Infantry Division were the headquarters element of what is officially known as the Multinational Forces, Combined Task Force 190, Republic of Haiti.

The U.S. Army Reserve unit, 458th Transportation Detachment (ATMCT), Belleville, Illinois, was activated and reported to Fort Bragg, North Carolina within 48 hours of notification. This was the fastest a Reserve unit has ever been deployed. The 458th manned the 18th Corps Joint Movement Control Center (JMCC) in support of the mission.

Members of the 450th Civil Affairs Battalion (Airborne) Riverdale, Maryland, USACAPOC(A), (an US Army Reserve unit), was on the initial airborne assault mission of Operation Uphold Democracy. The 450th CA Bn. (A) was the civil affairs unit supporting the 82nd Airborne Division. The unit not only participated with the 82nd, during training operations for this mission, before September 1994, but members of 450th "ready team" were on the C-130 aircraft about to parachute into the country. The parachute jump was aborted within 20 minutes of exiting out the door of the aircraft. The unit returned to Ft. Bragg, and then deployed (air landed) to Haiti the next day, supporting the 10th Mountain Division and Marines. The unit conducted civil affairs operations and remained in the country until December of that year.

End of operations
Jean Bertrand Aristide returned to Haiti in October 1994 after 3 years of forced exile. Operation Uphold Democracy officially ended on 31 March 1995, when it was replaced by the United Nations Mission in Haiti (UNMIH). U.S. President Bill Clinton and Haitian President Jean Bertrand Aristide presided over the change of authority ceremony. From March 1995 until March 1996, 2,400 U.S. personnel from the original Operation Uphold Democracy remained as a UNMIH-commanded support group under the aegis of Operation New Horizons. A large contingent of U.S. troops (USFORHAITI) participated as peacekeepers in the UNMIH until 1996 (and the U.S. forces commander was also the commander of the U.N. forces). U.N. forces under various mission names were in Haiti from 1995 through 2000. Over the course of the operation one U.S. soldier, a special forces staff sergeant, was killed. The soldier died after being struck by gunfire at a roadside checkpoint.

Three Argentine Navy corvettes of the  joined the mission to force the commercial embargo of Haiti.

References

Further reading
 

 

 

 

Haitian military junta (1991-1994)
1994 in Haiti
1995 in Haiti
Uphold Democracy
Uphold Democracy
Uphold Democracy
Haiti and the United Nations
History of Haiti
20th-century military history of the United States
Invasions by the United States
Invasions of Haiti
Argentina–Haiti relations
Haiti–United States military relations
Haiti–Poland relations
Uphold Democracy
Uphold Democracy
Uphold Democracy
Presidency of Bill Clinton